Maro is a genus of dwarf spiders that was first described by Octavius Pickard-Cambridge in 1907.

Species
 it contains thirteen species:
Maro bureensis Tanasevitch, 2006 – Russia (Far East)
Maro flavescens (O. Pickard-Cambridge, 1873) – Russia (South Siberia, Far East), Mongolia
Maro khabarum Tanasevitch, 2006 – Russia (Far East)
Maro lehtineni Saaristo, 1971 – Europe (Central and Northern)
Maro lepidus Casemir, 1961 – Europe
Maro minutus O. Pickard-Cambridge, 1907 (type) – Europe
Maro nearcticus Dondale & Buckle, 2001 – Canada, USA, Mexico
Maro pansibiricus Tanasevitch, 2006 – Russia (Europe to Far East)
Maro perpusillus Saito, 1984 – Japan
Maro saaristoi Eskov, 1980 – Russia (Siberia, Far East, Sakhalin)
Maro sibiricus Eskov, 1980 – Russia (Europe to Far East/East Siberia)
Maro sublestus Falconer, 1915 – Europe, Russia (Europe to West Siberia)
Maro ussuricus Tanasevitch, 2006 – Russia (Far East)

See also
 List of Linyphiidae species (I–P)

References

Araneomorphae genera
Linyphiidae
Spiders of Asia
Spiders of North America
Taxa named by Octavius Pickard-Cambridge